Jason Matthew Smith (born November 8, 1972) is an American film and television actor.

Background 
Born in Indianapolis, Indiana, he was raised in the mid-west with his three siblings and parents, and a pig farm. He lived in Cincinnati through high school and while earning his Bachelor of Fine Art in acting from the University of Cincinnati. He then earned a Master of Fine Arts in acting from the Northern Illinois University.

His acting career began when he moved to Los Angeles in 2000.

Filmography

Film

Television

External links

Living people
1972 births
African-American male actors
American male film actors
American male television actors
University of Cincinnati alumni
Northern Illinois University alumni
21st-century African-American people
20th-century African-American people